Dániel Nagy (born 15 March 1991) is a Hungarian football midfielder.

Club statistics

Hamburger SV
He was signed from Hungarian Újpest FC in 2007, 
In 2008, he signed a professional contract with Hamburger SV. He played mainly for the reserves, in the fourth division.
In a friendly match, he made his debut in the first team and scored a goal in the summer of 2011. In 2012, Hamburg and Nagy have been cancelled his contract with mutual consent.

VfL Osnabrück
In the summer of 2012, Nagy signed for Osnasbrück in the third division. In his first season, he made 3 goals and 6 assist.

On 2 August 2013, he made his debut in the DFB-Pokal against second division-side Erzgebirge Aue, at an eventual 3–0 home win, where he scored two goals.

Club statistics

Updated to games played as of 15 May 2021.

References

1991 births
Living people
Footballers from Budapest
Hungarian footballers
Hungary youth international footballers
Hungary international footballers
Association football midfielders
Hamburger SV II players
Hamburger SV players
VfL Osnabrück players
Ferencvárosi TC footballers
Würzburger Kickers players
Újpest FC players
Mezőkövesdi SE footballers
3. Liga players
Nemzeti Bajnokság I players
2. Bundesliga players
Hungarian expatriate footballers
Expatriate footballers in Germany
Hungarian expatriate sportspeople in Germany